Bank payment obligation (BPO) is a class of settlement solution in international supply chain finance.

The solution is championed by SWIFT and the International Chamber of Commerce (ICC) Banking Commission as a means to move away from letter of credit schemes toward "support[ing] the development of a globally accepted standardised environment and establishment of the BPO as a neutral industry-wide practice".

History
The International Chamber of Commerce (Banking Commission) Bank Payments Obligation Working Group (ICC-BPO) held its first meeting in Zurich, Switzerland in March 2011 with the participation of nine banks. The ICC Banking Commission and SWIFT developed the Uniform Rules for Bank Payment Obligations (URBPO), which were launched on 24 June 2013.

See also
International Chamber of Commerce
Letter of credit
Supply chain
Supply chain management
SWIFT

References

Further reading
ICC: Uniform Rules for Bank Payment Obligations, ICC Publishing S.A., 2013, 
ICC: Uniform Rules for Bank Payment Obligation (URBPO)
Bank Payment Obligation (Presentation), André Casterman. Head of Cash, Trade and Supply Chain Management, SWIFT. 13 May 2011.
 SWIFT Resource Centre: Trade and Supply Chain, BPO presentations, factsheet, webinar and case studies
International finance